Attila Horváth (born 23 January 1971) is a retired Hungarian international football player.

Career
During his career he used to play as a midfielder. On club level has played for Zalaegerszegi TE in his home country, Hungary until 1996. That summer he moved to Austrian FK Austria Wien but played only one Austrian Bundesliga match in early part of the 1996–97 season. Still that season he returned to Hungary signing this time with Videoton FC where he will play until 1999. In summer 2000 he signed with Slovenian NK Mura, playing in the 2000-01 Slovenian PrvaLiga season.

National team
He has played two matches for the Hungarian national team, both in April 1996, one against Croatia and another against Austria.

References

External sources 
 

Living people
1971 births
Hungarian footballers
Hungary international footballers
Zalaegerszegi TE players
Fehérvár FC players
SKN St. Pölten players
FK Austria Wien players
Austrian Football Bundesliga players
Expatriate footballers in Austria
Hungarian expatriate sportspeople in Austria
NK Mura players
Expatriate footballers in Slovenia
Hungarian expatriates in Slovenia
Association football midfielders
People from Zalaegerszeg
Sportspeople from Zala County